Zedazeni Monastery is a Georgian Orthodox monastery, located on the Zedazeni mountain the hills of Saguramo Range, northeast to Mtskheta and to the east side of the Aragvi River.

The monastery was founded by Saint John, one of the Holy Assyrian Fathers of Georgia whose mission was to strengthen Christianity in the region.

History
Saint John founded the monastery in the 540s (6th century) on Zedazeni mountain, where prior to Christianity used to be a  cult of Zaden, the idol of fruitfulness.

References 
 

Georgian Orthodox monasteries